Prisioneira (English: Trapped) is a Portuguese telenovela broadcast and produced by TVI. It is written by Maria João Mira. The telenovela premiered on May 21, 2019 and ended on February 22, 2020. It is recorded between Lisbon and Tunisia.

Plot 
A revolutionary Muslim doctor is fighting for a fair and less fractured world. He falls madly in love with a Portuguese woman and rescues her from a loveless life. However, this rescue turns into an unexpected captivity and an unfair fight for the custody of a child, since he is forced to marry another woman.

The plot, which takes place between Lisbon and a Maghreb country features a love among different beliefs and traditions that will always be affected by a terror attack.

Seasons

Cast

References

External links

2019 telenovelas
Portuguese telenovelas
Televisão Independente telenovelas
2019 Portuguese television series debuts
2020 Portuguese television series endings
Portuguese-language telenovelas